Darius B. Moon  (1851–1939) was an architect in Lansing, Michigan, United States.  A largely self-educated poet, artist and craftsman, Moon built over 260 structures, most of them in the area of Lansing  and East Lansing, Michigan, during a prolific career that stretched from 1860 to 1923.

Darius B. Moon was born in 1851 in Cattaraugus County, New York, and moved to Eaton County, Michigan when he was three years old. He was married in 1877, and moved to Lansing by 1883 and began his career as a builder. He was interested in architecture from an early age, and was likely self-taught. Following his interest, by 1888 he was working as an architect. He worked alone until 1909, when he partnered with Raymond Spice to form the firm of Moon and Spice. He continued working until his retirement in 1923.

His Queen Anne-style houses range from the Ransom E. Olds residence (demolished in 1971 to make way for the R. E. Olds Freeway) to the Howland House student co-op (originally the home of Chester D. Woodbury) in East Lansing. He also designed residences for Henry Kosltchek, Edward D. Sparrow, Frank Dodge, Judge Person, and H.M. Rogers. In addition to houses, Moon designed four schools, the Olds Motor Works, and the original Sparrow Hospital.

Works
 1873: Delta Center Trinity Methodist Church
 1889: Benjamin Davis House
 1890: Michigan Millers Mutual Fire Insurance Company Building
 1894: Darius B. Moon House
 1900: Turner-Dodge House

External links
Phantom Moon over Lansing
Darius Moon
LisforLansing Gallery: Darius Moon House
"Moon Remembered" by Faith Rach, 1997

References

People from Lansing, Michigan
1851 births
1939 deaths